Dol is a village on the island of Hvar, Croatia. It has a population of 348 (census 2001). It is administratively located within the area of Stari Grad.

Around the village speleologists have discovered multiple pits containing the remains of World War II victims which have yet to be exhumed. The Kopanjica pit contains the remains of civilians killed by Yugoslav Partisans in 1943.

Population

References

Populated places in Split-Dalmatia County
Hvar